"Wonderful Tonight" is a ballad written by Eric Clapton. It was included on Clapton's 1977 album Slowhand. Clapton wrote the song about Pattie Boyd. The female vocal harmonies on the song are provided by Marcella Detroit (then Marcy Levy) and Yvonne Elliman.

Background
On 7 September 1976, Clapton wrote "Wonderful Tonight" for Boyd while waiting for her to get ready to attend Paul and Linda McCartney's annual Buddy Holly party. The song is mentioned in her autobiographical book Wonderful Today.

Critical reception
Billboard described "Wonderful Tonight" as "perhaps Clapton's prettiest and mellowest love ballad in some time."  Billboard particularly praised Clapton's guitar playing during the interludes.  Cash Box said that "Eric’s singing is superbly understated; the guitar work is simple and evocative" and praised "the gentle beat and organ accompaniment."  Record World called it a "light, pretty ballad from [the album] that should also move quickly up the charts" and praised Clapton's singing."

Personnel
 Eric Clapton – lead vocals, guitar
 Jamie Oldaker – drums, percussion
 Carl Radle – bass guitar
 Dick Sims – Fender Rhodes, Hammond organ
 George Terry – guitar
 Yvonne Elliman – harmony and backing vocals
 Marcy Levy – harmony and backing vocals

Performance
In 1988, Clapton appeared in the Nelson Mandela 70th Birthday Tribute concert as a guest guitarist for Dire Straits. The group became his backing musicians for a surprise performance of "Wonderful Tonight" during their set.

Charts

Weekly charts

Year-end charts

Certifications

Cover versions

Damage version

British R&B group Damage covered "Wonderful Tonight" and released it as the fifth single from their debut studio album, Forever (1997), in April 1997. The single peaked at number three on the UK Singles Chart, becoming the band's highest-charting single. The song is prominently performed by Coreé Richards, with little vocal input from any other members of the band. The music video features the band performing the song in a recording studio with cut scenes of a girl preparing to go on a night out. The B-side, "I'm Ready", launched the career of Craig David, being the first song he had ever written to be released by himself or another artist.

Track listings
 UK CD1
 "Wonderful Tonight"
 "I'm Ready" 
 "Wonderful Tonight" (Ethnic Boyz Mix)

 UK CD2
 "Wonderful Tonight" (acoustic mix)
 "Just My Imagination" 
 "Love II Love" (acoustic mix)

 UK cassette single
 "Wonderful Tonight"
 "I'm Ready"

Charts

Weekly charts

Year-end charts

Certifications

Release history

David Kersh version

"Wonderful Tonight" was covered by country singer David Kersh in 1998. His version went to number 29 on the Hot Country Songs chart.

Charts

Butch Baker version
 The song was covered by country music singer Butch Baker, whose rendition reached number 66 on the Billboard Hot Country Songs chart in 1989.

Michael Bublé version
"Wonderful Tonight" was covered by singer Michael Bublé in 2007 on his album Call Me Irresponsible.  That album reached number one on the Billboard 200 charts on 26 May 2007.

References

External links
 Allmusic review

1970s ballads
1977 singles
1997 singles
1998 singles
Afroman songs
Butch Baker songs
Curb Records singles
Damage (British band) songs
David Kersh songs
Eric Clapton songs
Oricon International Singles Chart number-one singles
British soft rock songs
Rock ballads
RSO Records singles
Big Life Records singles
Song recordings produced by Glyn Johns
Songs written by Eric Clapton
1977 songs
Songs about nights